Helmut Paul Möckel (7 December 1921 – 22 December 2011) was a German soccer player in Zwickau, Germany. He became first German Democratic Republic Soccer Champion in 1950 with the soccer team BSG Horch Zwickau.

The in 1949 founded club Betriebssportgemeinschaft (BSG) Horch Zwickau finished the soccer season of 1948–49 as 4th in the Soccer Championship of Saxony. After 3 qualifying matches against the Thüringer SG Zeiss Jena (1:1, 2:2 and 5:1) they qualified for the newly founded German Democratic Republic Premier League. Part of the team (BsG) Horch Zwickau (now FSV Zwickau) during the first season in 1949–50 was also the 27-year-old defender Helmut Möckel. The team finished this season as the first official German Premier League Champion. He retired from professional soccer after the season of 1954–55 at 33 years old and participated in 124 out of the 184 premier league games played during this time.

References 

1921 births
2011 deaths
East German footballers
People from Zwickau
Association football defenders
Footballers from Saxony
FSV Zwickau players